Silvano may refer to:

 Silvano (name)
 Silvano (surname)
 Silvano (opera), an 1895 opera by Pietro Mascagni
 Da Silvano, a former Italian restaurant in Manhattan, New York City
 Silvano, a 1983 fatal insomnia patient in Bologna, Italy
 Silvano, founder of House of Gravina

See also
 Silvano d'Orba, a comune in Alessandria, Piedmont, Italy
 Silvano Pietra, a comune in Pavia, Lombardy, Italy
 Silvani